JTAC may refer to:

 JTAC Hill, a fort in Helmand Province, Afghanistan 
 Joint Terrorism Analysis Centre, advises the UK government on terrorist threats
 Joint Terminal Attack Controller, someone who directs aircraft etc. in a military operation 
 Advanced Mobile Phone System#TACS.2C ETACS and JTAC variants, an analogue mobile phone standard, also known Japanese Total Access Communication
 Juniper Networks Technical Assistance Center
 Journal of Thermal Analysis and Calorimetry, a scientific journal